The Fula oil field is an oil field located in Muglad Basin. It was discovered in 2001 and developed by China National Petroleum Corporation. It began production in 2004 and produces oil.

References

Oil fields of Sudan